VeraLinn Jamieson (born 1960) is a retired United States Air Force lieutenant general. She last served as the Deputy Chief of Staff for Intelligence, Surveillance and Reconnaissance, a position she held from 2016 to 2020.

References

External links 

 

 

Living people
Female generals of the United States Air Force
1960 births
21st-century American women